These are lists of pairs by type.

Family
 List of twins
 List of sibling pairs
 List of coupled cousins

Places
 Lists of twin towns and sister cities

Fiction
 List of fictional detective teams
 List of mythological pairs
 List of fictional supercouples

See also
 Supercouple

Lists of pairs